Ripak may refer to:
 Ripak-e Abdok
 Ripak-e Lal Mohammad
 Ripak-e Pirandad
 Ripak-e Saleh
 Ripak-e Shiran